Shafak may refer to:

 Elif Şafak (born 1971), Turkish novelist
 Vanevan, Armenia, formerly Shafak